New Era is the debut album of Finnish power metal pioneer Timo Tolkki's band, Revolution Renaissance. After Tolkki's split from Stratovarius in 2008 he used what fan's knew the album to be titled R... R.... as the namesake for his new project. Using material he had written for Stratovarius's upcoming album, Tolkki's New Era features the talents of German power metal vocalist Tobias Sammet and German singer Michael Kiske among others.

Track listing
Credits from the Metal Archives.

 "Heroes" (Lead vocals: Tobias Sammet) – 4:20
 "I Did It My Way" (Lead vocals: Michael Kiske) – 4:22
 "We Are Magic" (Lead vocals: Pasi Rantanen) – 4:23
 "Angel" (Lead vocals: Kiske) – 4:51
 "Eden Is Burning" (Lead vocals: Rantanen) – 5:16
 "Glorious and Divine" (Lead vocals: Sammet) – 4:43
 "Born Upon the Cross" (Lead vocals: Rantanen) – 4:02
 "Keep the Flame Alive" (Lead vocals: Kiske) – 4:32
 "Last Night on Earth" (Lead vocals: Kiske) – 4:46
 "Revolution Renaissance" (Lead vocals: Kiske) – 6:10
 "Glorious and Divine (Stratovarius Demo)" (Performed by Stratovarius in 2006) [Japanese Bonus Track]

Personnel 
Timo Tolkki – guitar
Pasi Heikkilä – bass (except tracks 1 and 6)
Joonas Puolakka – keyboards
Mirka Rantanen – drums
Michael Kiske – vocals (tracks 2, 4, 8-10)
Pasi Rantanen – vocals (tracks 3, 5 and 7)
Tobias Sammet – vocals and bass (tracks 1 and 6)
Timo Kotipelto – vocals (track 11)

References

2008 albums
Revolution Renaissance albums
Frontiers Records albums